, better known as , is a Japanese professional kickboxer. She is a former Knock Out-Black Female Minimumweight Champion, Knock Out-Black Female Atomweight Champion, and Rebels-Black Women's 46 kg Champion. After moving from Osaka to Tokyo at the age of 21, Rina discovered kickboxing and began competing at the amateur level in 2017. She made her professional debut in February 2019, and remains undefeated in 13 bouts.

Early life and amateur career
Rina was born in Toyonaka, Osaka Prefecture on March 17, 1994, as the youngest of three children. With one older brother and one older sister, she said she was spoiled. Rina started swimming at the age of five and continued for 10 years. She suffered from atopic dermatitis, and also said her low body fat percentage made her unsuited for the sport. Her parents wanted her to be an actress, and had her audition for commercials from the age of six. But Rina said she was restless and could never sit through an audition. In sixth grade, Rina's parents had her audition for the original AKB48. She made it to the final interview, but declined it as she was not interested in being an idol. In junior high, Rina broke her school's marathon record three consecutive years in a row and was scouted to join the track and field club in her final year of junior high. However, she had to give up the sport after suffering a stress fracture in high school from excessive running. Without many friends and unable to play sports, the only thing she cared about, Rina stopped going to school and eventually quit.

Living on her own since the age of 17, she wandered from place to place working part-time jobs. At 21, she decided to move to Tokyo for a fresh start. There, she discovered kickboxing. Although it began as exercise, Rina quickly had the desire to compete, feeling that she "was born" to be a kickboxer. She joined the gym Struggle, founded by former professional kickboxer Hideaki Suzuki, on March 1, 2017. She traveled to Thailand several times to train and fight in Muay Thai. As an amateur, Rina was the 2018 Girls Bloom Cup -50 kg Champion and the Kaminarimon All Japan 2018 47 kg Champion. Her amateur record was 11 wins and 1 loss.

Rina's nickname comes from the Dragon Ball character Pan. While watching Dragon Ball together on Rina's 20th birthday, a friend told her she looked like the character. Elated, Rina changed her social media handle to "Panchan" and everyone started calling her by the name. The character is most prominently featured in Dragon Ball GT, and Rina uses that anime's theme song, "Dan Dan Kokoro Hikareteku", as her entrance music.

Professional career
Rina made her professional debut facing high school student Erisa Kawashima at Pancrase Rebels Ring 1 Night on February 17, 2019, with the winner earning a multi-fight contract with Rebels. Rina won the fight by unanimous decision. For her second match, Rina faced Sae_KMG at Rebels 60 on April 20, 2019. It was contested under Rebels' Muay Thai rules, which do not allow elbows. Rina won by unanimous decision. At Rebels 61 on June 9, 2019, Rina had a kickboxing match against mixed martial artist Si Woo Park. She won by unanimous decision. In her fourth professional match, first with three-minute-long rounds, Rina faced Shoko at K.O Climax 2019 Summer Kick Fever on August 18, 2019. Although it was put on by the Knock Out promotion, the match used Rebels Muay Thai rules. Rina won the bout by majority decision. In another Rebels Muay Thai rules fight, Rina faced J-Girls Pinweight Champion Mirey at Knock Out × Rebels on October 4, 2019, and won by unanimous decision. On December 8, 2019, Rina faced Petchompoo Mor Krungthepthonburi at Shin Nihon Kickboxing Association's Soul in the Ring Climax. The doctor stopped the match at 2:20 of round one due to a cut on Mor Krungthepthonburi, earning Rina her first technical knockout.

Because one of the judges scored their previous bout a draw, Rina requested a rematch with Shoko. It took place at Knock Out Championship 1 on February 11, 2020, with Rina winning by unanimous decision. Rebels then announced that Rina would face shoot boxer and former J-Girls Miniflyweight Champion Misaki Morita for the inaugural Rebels-Black Women's 46 kg Championship as the co-main event of Rebels 65. The match was sponsored by the manga series Taiga of Genesis, with the winner receiving an additional ¥200,000 from its author. Originally set for April 24, 2020, the event was rescheduled three times due to the COVID-19 pandemic in Japan, finally taking place on August 30, 2020. Rina won the match, and her first professional championship, by unanimous decision. In her first main event, Rina faced former Minerva Pinweight Champion Mari in a non-title match at Rebels 67 on November 8, 2020. She won the 47 kg bout by unanimous decision. Later that month, Rina underwent surgery on her right hand due to an injury she sustained in the fight.

At a New Years awards ceremony held by Rebels and Knock Out in January 2021, Rina received the Outstanding Performance Award for her performances in the previous year. In March 2021, Rebels was merged into the Knock Out promotion and Rina's Rebels-Black Women's 46 kg Championship became the Knock Out-Black Female Atomweight Championship. After being postponed because of the continued COVID-19 pandemic, Rina made her return to competition in a rematch with Mirey, the J-Girls and WMC Japan Pinweight Champion, at Knock Out 2021 Vol. 2 on May 22, 2021. She won the non-title fight at 2:30 of the first round, with the first proper knockout of her career. She also received a ¥200,000 win bonus sponsored by Taiga of Genesis. After requesting a match against Minerva Light Flyweight Champion Hitomi "Sasori" Nagai for 10 months, Rina finally faced her at Knock Out 2021 Vol. 3 on July 18, 2021. Rina won the 48.4 kg bout by majority decision. She also received another ¥200,000 win bonus sponsored by Taiga of Genesis. Rina faced Momoka Mandokoro at Rizin 30 on September 19, 2021, in what was the promotion's first ever women's kickboxing match. She won the bout by unanimous decision. In an auction Rizin Fighting Federation held later in the month, Rina's autographed gloves from the match sold for ¥400,000, the highest bid of the auction. Rina then had two exhibition bouts before the year was out, both of which were ruled no contest when their time limits elapsed. The first was two two-minute rounds against RISE's number two ranked mini flyweight Moe Okura at Bout 43 on November 21, 2021. The second was the second of three rounds in Hitomi "Sasori" Nagai's retirement match that took place at Nihon Kickboxing's Victory Series Vol. 7 on December 11, 2021.

On December 19, 2021, it was announced that Rina had vacated the Knock Out-Black Female Atomweight Championship and would move up a weight class to challenge Miki Kitamura for the inaugural Knock Out-Black Female Minimumweight Championship. Originally set for Knock Out 2022 Vol. 1 on January 22, 2022, the match had to be rescheduled after Rina contracted COVID-19. It took place on March 12, 2022, at Knock Out 2022 Vol. 2, with Rina winning her second professional championship by unanimous decision. In April 2022, Rina announced she had surgery to repair the anterior cruciate ligament in her left knee that was damaged during training, and would be out of competition for at least a year. On October 12, it was announced that Rina had left Struggle, the gym she had been with for five years. After discussing her life and future, she made the decision to become a freelance fighter on October 8.

On December 5, 2022, Rina was arrested by Hyogo Prefectural Police on suspicion of fraud for selling a fake limited-edition poster signed by Tenshin Nasukawa and Takeru for ¥99,900 via an internet auction. Rina reportedly admitted to the accusations. On January 23, 2023, she uploaded a video to her YouTube account apologizing for her actions. In it, Rina explained that she had fallen victim to an internet scam and lost ¥15 million by June 2022. Unable to compete due to her injury, she sold the poster in order to recoup some of her loses. Rina was released from jail the day after her arrest, and claims to have met with the victim, who accepted her apology. The criminal case against Rina was dropped nolle prosequi on March 10, 2023.

On February 17, 2023, Rina and Knock Out held a press conference where it was announced that she had voluntarily vacated the Knock Out-Black Female Minimumweight Championship due to the incident. Rina made her return to the ring in a boxing-only exhibition bout scheduled for two two-minute rounds at Knock Out 2023 Super Bout "Blaze" on March 5. Her opponent was Ruka Sakamoto, who is known for competing in Breaking Down, a combat sports promotion where people, trained fighters or internet celebrities alike, fight in a single round lasting one minute. The bout was ruled a draw when the time limit elapsed. Rina is scheduled to make her kickboxing return at Knock Out 2023 Vol. 1 on April 22.

Other ventures
Rina made her gravure modeling debut in the July 2019 issue of Young Animal. She then posed for the January 27, 2020 issue of Weekly Playboy. That same month she became an "image character" for the real estate company Dear Life, whose parent company, DL Holdings, sponsors a Muay Thai event. Rina and Kai Asakura shared the cover of the November 2020 issue of Gong Kakutogi, which also featured an interview with the two. Rina walked the runway at Nara Collection 2021 in three different outfits. Her first photobook, was released on June 10, 2022. Rina was a special guest judge for the Miss Oriental 2022 Nihon Taikai beauty pageant. Rina is noted for her use of social media. Her YouTube channel, which she started in May 2020, has over 161,000 subscribers.

Championships and accomplishments

Kickboxing
Professional
 Knock Out
 Knock Out-Black Female Minimumweight Champion (one-time, inaugural)
 Knock Out-Black Female Atomweight Champion (one-time, inaugural)
 Win bonus (two times)
 Rebels
 Rebels-Black Women's 46 kg Champion (one-time, last)
 Outstanding Performance Award (2021)
 Win bonus (one time)
Amateur
 Kaminarimon
 Kaminarimon All Japan 2018 47 kg Champion
 J-Network
 2018 Girls Bloom Cup -50 kg Champion

Kickboxing record

|-  style="background:#CCFFCC;"
| 2022-03-12 || Win ||align=left| Miki Kitamura || Knock Out 2022 Vol. 2 || Tokyo, Japan || Decision (Unanimous) || 3 || 3:00 ||
|-
! style=background:white colspan=9 |
|-  style="background:#CCFFCC;"
| 2021-09-19 || Win ||align=left| Momoka Mandokoro || Rizin 30 || Saitama, Japan || Decision (Unanimous) || 3 || 3:00 ||
|-
|-  style="background:#CCFFCC;"
| 2021-07-18 || Win ||align=left| Sasori || Knock Out 2021 Vol. 3 || Tokyo, Japan || Decision (Majority) || 3 || 3:00 ||
|-
|-  style="background:#CCFFCC;"
| 2021-05-22|| Win ||align=left| Mirey || Knock Out 2021 Vol. 2 || Tokyo, Japan || KO (Straight right) || 1 || 2:30 ||
|-
|-  style="background:#CCFFCC;"
| 2020-11-08|| Win ||align=left| Mari || REBELS 67 || Tokyo, Japan || Decision (Unanimous)|| 3 || 3:00 ||
|-
|-  style="background:#CCFFCC;"
| 2020-08-30|| Win ||align=left| MISAKI || REBELS 65 || Tokyo, Japan || Decision (Unanimous)|| 3 || 3:00 ||
|-
! style=background:white colspan=9 |
|-  style="background:#CCFFCC;"
| 2020-02-11 || Win ||align=left| Shoko || Knock Out Championship 1 || Tokyo, Japan || Decision (Unanimous) || 3 || 3:00 ||
|-
|-  style="background:#CCFFCC;"
| 2019-12-08 || Win ||align=left| Petchompoo Mor Krungthepthonburi || Soul in the Ring Climax || Tokyo, Japan || TKO (Doctor stoppage) || 1 || 2:20 ||
|-
|-  style="background:#CCFFCC;"
| 2019-10-04|| Win ||align=left| Mirey || Knock Out × Rebels || Tokyo, Japan || Decision (Unanimous) || 3 || 3:00 || Rebels Muay Thai rules
|-
|-  style="background:#CCFFCC;"
| 2019-08-18|| Win ||align=left| Shoko || K.O Climax 2019 Summer Kick Fever || Tokyo, Japan || Decision (Majority)|| 3 || 3:00 || Rebels Muay Thai rules
|-
|-  style="background:#CCFFCC;"
| 2019-06-09|| Win ||align=left| Si Woo Park || REBELS 61 || Tokyo, Japan || Decision (Unanimous) ||3 || 2:00 ||
|-
|-  style="background:#CCFFCC;"
| 2019-04-20 || Win||align=left| Sae_KMG || REBELS 60 || Tokyo, Japan || Decision  (Unanimous) || 3 || 2:00 || Rebels Muay Thai rules
|-
|-  style="background:#CCFFCC;"
| 2019-02-17|| Win ||align=left| Erisa Kawashima || Pancrase Rebels Ring 1 Night || Tokyo, Japan || Decision  (Unanimous) || 3 || 2:00 ||
|-
|-
| colspan=9 | Legend:

References

External links
Archived profile at Struggle

1994 births
Living people
Japanese female kickboxers
Sportspeople from Osaka Prefecture
People from Toyonaka, Osaka
Kickboxing champions